Abbai may refer to:
One of the civilizations in Babylon 5
Blue Nile, also known as the Abbai river